Timothy Grubb (30 May 1954 – 11 May 2010) was a British show jumping champion. In 1984 he participated at the Summer Olympics held in Los Angeles where he won a silver medal in team jumping with the British team.

He was born in Grantham.

Personal life
He married Michele McEvoy and they had a boy and a girl. They later divorced.

He died from heart failure in Illinois on 11 May 2010.

References

1954 births
2010 deaths
People from Grantham
Olympic silver medallists for Great Britain
Equestrians at the 1984 Summer Olympics
Equestrians at the 1992 Summer Olympics
Olympic equestrians of Great Britain
British male equestrians
English male equestrians
Olympic medalists in equestrian

Medalists at the 1984 Summer Olympics